The Mnet 20's Choice Awards was a major music awards show that was held annually in South Korea, organized by CJ E&M through its Mnet channel.

2013
The 2013 20's Choice Awards were held on July 18, 2013, at the Korea International Exhibition Center (KINTEX) in Ilsan, Goyang, South Korea. The event was hosted by Shinhwa's Minwoo and Jun Jin and TV personality Kim Seul-gi. The theme was "Legend of 20's".

Here is the list of winners.

20's Choice Awards

Special Awards

2012
The theme of the 2012 show was "Do [Don'ts] Super 20's" and the nominations were announced on June 7, with the ceremony taking place on June 28. The winners are listed as follows:

20's Drama Actor: Kim Soo-hyun
20's Drama Actress: Han Ji-min
20's Movie Actor: Lee Je-hoon
20's Movie Actress: Suzy
20's Online Music: Busker Busker
20's Trendy Music: Girls' Generation-TTS
20's Band Music: The Koxx
20's Performance: Trouble Maker (Hyuna & Hyunseung) 
20's Sexiest Performance: Sistar
20's Style:  Jang Yoon-ju
20's Click: Fashion King
20's Do Don'ts: Park Jin-young
20's Social Artist: Lee Hyori
20's Gag Character: Raitto
20's Upcoming 20's: Yeo Jin-goo
20's Booming Star: Jo Jung-suk
20's Sports Star: Koo Ja-cheol
20's Global Star: Super Junior
20's Blue Carpet Star: Kim Soo-hyun
20's Variety Star: Han Hye-jin

2011
The ceremony took place on July 7 at the River Park outdoor swimming pool at Seoul-Walkerhill Hotel with actor Song Joong-ki and singer Bae Suzy of miss A as MCs. 
Hot Drama Actor: Cha Seung-won
Hot Drama Actress: Gong Hyo-jin
Hot Style Icon: Gong Hyo-jin
Hot Korean Wave Star: Kara
Hot Blue Carpet Star: f(x)
Hot New Star: Suzy
Hot Performance Star: Beast
Hot Funniest Guys: BalleriNO
Hot Body Female: Lee Ha-nui
Hot Body Male: Cha Seung-won
Hot 20's Voice: Yoo Ah-in
Hot Campus Girl: Goo Hara
Hot Trend Musician: f(x)
Hot Online Song: "Black & White" (G.NA)
Pocari Sweat Hot Balance Star: 2AM
Hot Trendy Guy: Kim Min-jun
Hot Mentor: Lee Seung-chul
Hot Variety Star: Yoo Se-yoon
Hot Movie Star: Kang So-ra
Hot Sports Star: Son Yeon-jae
Hot CF Star: IU

2010
20's Most Influential Stars:
2PM
4Minute
T-ara
2AM
Lee Soo-geun
Ki Sung-Yueng
Kim Tae-won
Supreme Team
Park Myung-soo
Bang Si-hyuk
Kim Hyun-joong
Tiger JK and Yoon Mi-rae
Kim Kap-soo
UV
Shin Se-kyung
Chun Jung-myung
Lee Jung-jae
Seo In-young
Jo Kwon
Ahn Cheol-soo

Smoothie King Cool Star Award: Beast

Favorite Style Girl Group for Dance, Style, and Body: 4Minute

Daum's Search Hot Star Award: 2PM

2009
Hot Drama Star, Male: Lee Seung-gi (Brilliant Legacy) 
Hot Drama Star, Female: Han Hyo-joo (Brilliant Legacy)
Hot Movie Star, Male: Ha Jung-woo (Take Off)  
Hot Movie Star, Female: Ha Ji-won (Haeundae)  
Hot CF Star: 2NE1 & Big Bang – "Lollipop"  
Hot New Star: 2NE1  
Hot Variety Star: Gil
Hot Character: Teacher Kang  
Hot Multitainer: Lee Hyori  
Hot Sport Star: Yuna Kim  
Hot Body: Lee Hyori  
Hot Style Icon: Lee Hyori
Hot Fashionista: Shin Min-a
Hot Online Song: "Fire" by 2NE1
Hot Performance Star: 2PM 
Hot Boom Up Song: "Neverending Story" by Yoon Sang-hyun  
Hot Couple: Kim Yong-jun and Hwang Jung-eum 
Hot Mr. Beauty: Nichkhun 
Hot Summer Heat Popularity Award: 2PM

2008 
Hot Younger Male: Yoo Seung-ho
Hot Movie Star, Female: Kim Min-hee
Hot Movie Star, Male: Jang Keun-suk
Hot Drama Star, Male: Lee Beom-soo
Hot Drama Star, Female: Kim Min-jung
Hot Couple: Crown J & Seo In-young
Hot Online Song: "One More Time" (Jewelry)
Hot Sports Star: Jang Mi-ran
Hot Global Star: Park Yong-ha
Hot CF Star: Lee Kwang-soo, Hong In-young
Hot Fashionista: Ryoo Seung-bum
Hot Sweet Music: "Kissing You" (Girls' Generation)
Hot Club Music: "So Hot" (Wonder Girls)
Hot Style Icon: Lee Hyori
Hot Performance Musician: Lee Hyori
Hot Trend Musician: Big Bang
Hot New Star: Shinee
Hot Schoolgirl: Sohee of Wonder Girls
Hot Radio DJ: Kangin & Taeyeon "Good Friends"
Hot Character Star: Jun Jin
Hot Sitcom Star: Baek Sung-hyun
Hot Cable Show: Infinite Girls on MBC Every 1
Hot Comment: Crown J's "A~"
Hot Comeback Star: Roh Moo-hyun, ex-president
Hot Variety Star: Yoo Jae-suk
Hot Issuemaker: American beef

2007
Most Popular Group: Super Junior
Best Performance: Super Junior
Best Dresser: Super Junior
Best Bad Boy: Kangin
Best Pretty Boy: Kim Hee-chul
Best Vocal: SG Wannabe's Kim Jin-ho
Best DJ: Haha
Best Comedian: Kang Yoo-mi & Yoo Se-yoon
Best Body: Hyun Young
Best Entertainer: Hyun Young
Best Kiss: Choi Min-yong and Seo Min-jung
Best New Star: Jung Il-woo
Best Drama Star: Jung Il-woo
Best Female Artist: Ivy
Top Model: Song Kyung-ah
Best Alien: Andre Kim
Best Casting: Lee Soon-jae
Best Couple: Kim Bum & Kim Hye-sung
Best Drama Star: Park Hae-mi
Best Female Actress: Kim Ah-joong
Best Style: Gong Yoo & Lee Hyori
Best Male Artist: Se7en
Best Male Actor: Jo In-sung
Best CF Star: Jo In-sung
Best Photogenic: Jo In-sung

Most winners

See also 
 K-pop

References

External links
 
 

CJ E&M Music Performance Division
South Korean music awards
Awards established in 2007
Awards disestablished in 2013
Annual events in South Korea